Bruce Johnson co-founded a Canadian personal income tax software company named WinTax in 1992 with fellow University of Alberta graduate Chad Frederick. Johnson grew up in England. He earned his Computing Science degree from the University of Alberta in 1983.

Later, WinTax was acquired by Chipsoft, which in turn was acquired by Intuit Inc., becoming Intuit Canada. Johnson became CEO of Intuit Canada (and the associated UK operations) during his time with the company. He left his position as CEO in 2004, and has since ventured into several local technology start-ups.

Around 2008, Johnson became involved with Baby Gourmet and helped with funding and recruiting executives for the company.

In 2009, he was named to the advisory board of Bean Services, a Vancouver, BC-based developer of accounts payable automation software.

References

External links
TEC -  Board of Directors profiles
HeadCount Corporation - Board of Directors profiles
Zigtag home page
Baby Gourmet story

Year of birth missing (living people)
Living people
Canadian chief executives
Intuit people
Canadian company founders